Into the Light is a short-lived musical about a physicist who attempts to determine the truth behind the Shroud of Turin. His quest for the truth eventually takes a toll on his relationships with his wife and son.

Synopsis
James Prescott, a physicist from Los Alamos, is attempting to prove (or disprove) the truth of the Shroud of Turin. James' obsession with this task strains his relationship with his wife (Kate) and his young son (Matthew). Matthew, to compensate for the lack of his father, instead begins to trust a friend only he can see.

Musical Numbers

Act 1
 Prologue: Poltergiests - Matthew, Kate
 Neat/Not Neat - James, Father Frank, Kate
 It Can All Be Explained - James, Father Frank
 The Data - James, The Team
 A Talk About Time - James, Kate
 Trading Solos - Father Frank, Matthew, Friend
 Let There Be Light - James, Don, Father Frank, Signor Bocciarelli, Archbishop Parisi
 Wishes - Matthew
 The Three of Us - Kate, James
 Rainbow Logic - James

 Act 2
 Fede Fede - Don, Archbishop Parisi, Team
 To Measure the Darkness - James, Kate
 The Testing - James, Team
 The Rose and I - Kate
 The Testing (continued) - James, Team
 Measure the Darkness (reprise) - James
 Be There - James, Matthew
 Epilogue: Into the Light - Company

Productions

1986 Broadway
Opened at the Neil Simon Theatre on October 22, 1986 and closed on October 26, 1986 after playing 13 previews and 6 performances. It starred Dean Jones as James Prescott. The production was directed by Michael Maurer, with choreography from Mary Jane Houdina and music direction from Peter Howard. The production team consisted of Neil Peter Jampolis (Scenic/Projection/Lighting Design), Hervig Libowitzky (Scenic/Projection Design), Karen Roston (Costume Design), and Jack Mann (Sound Design).

References

1986 musicals
Broadway musicals